This is a list of electoral results for the electoral district of Salisbury in Queensland state elections.

Members for Salisbury

Election results

Elections in the 1980s

Elections in the 1970s

Elections in the 1960s

References

Queensland state electoral results by district